Charles Farrar Browne (April 26, 1834 – March 6, 1867) was an American humor writer, better known under his nom de plume, Artemus Ward, which as a character, an illiterate rube with "Yankee common sense", Browne also played in public performances. He is considered to be America's first stand-up comedian. His birth name was Brown but he added the "e" after he became famous.

Biography
Browne was born in Waterford, Maine. He began his career as a compositor and occasional contributor to the daily and weekly journals. In 1858, in The Plain Dealer newspaper (Cleveland, Ohio), he published the first of the "Artemus Ward" series, which, in collected form, achieved great popularity in both America and England.

Browne's companion at the Plain Dealer, George Hoyt, wrote: "his desk was a rickety table which had been whittled and gashed until it looked as if it had been the victim of lightning. His chair was a fit companion thereto, a wabbling, unsteady affair, sometimes with four and sometimes with three legs. But Browne saw neither the table, nor the chair, nor any person who might be near, nothing, in fact, but the funny pictures which were tumbling out of his brain. When writing, his gaunt form looked ridiculous enough. One leg hung over the arm of his chair like a great hook, while he would write away, sometimes laughing to himself, and then slapping the table in the excess of his mirth."

In 1860, he became editor of the first Vanity Fair, a humorous New York weekly that failed in 1863. At about the same time, he began to appear as a lecturer who, by his droll and eccentric humor, attracted large audiences. Browne was also known as a member of the New York bohemian set which included leader Henry Clapp Jr., Walt Whitman, Fitz Hugh Ludlow, and actress Adah Isaacs Menken.

In 1863, Browne came to San Francisco to perform as Artemus Ward. An early expert at show business publicity, Browne sent his manager ahead by several weeks to buy advertising in the local papers and promote the show among prominent citizens for endorsements. On November 13, 1863, Browne stood before a packed crowd at Platt's Music Hall, playing the part of Artemus Ward as an illiterate rube but with "Yankee common sense." Writer Bret Harte was in the audience that night and he described it in the Golden Era as capturing American speech: "humor that belongs to the country of boundless prairies, limitless rivers, and stupendous cataracts—that fun which overlies the surface of our national life, which is met in the stage, rail-car, canal and flat-boat, which bursts out over camp-fires and around bar-room stoves."

"Artemus Ward" was a favorite author of U.S. President Abraham Lincoln. Before presenting "The Emancipation Proclamation" to his Cabinet, Lincoln read to them the latest episode, "Outrage in Utiky", also known as "High-Handed Outrage at Utica".

When Browne performed in Virginia City, Nevada, he met Mark Twain and the two became friends. In his correspondence with Twain,  Browne called him "My Dearest Love." Legend has it that, following a stage performance there, Browne, Twain, and Dan De Quille were trekking on a (drunken) rooftop tour of Virginia City until a town constable threatened to blast all three with a shotgun loaded with rock salt. Browne recommended Twain to the editors of the New York Press and urged him to journey to New York.

In 1866, Browne visited England and attracted a large following to his playing Artemus Ward, both as lecturer and for his literary contributions to Punch. But within a year his health gave way and he died of tuberculosis at Southampton on March 6, 1867.

In England Browne was buried at Kensal Green Cemetery, but his remains were removed to the United States in 1868 and buried at Elm Vale Cemetery in Waterford, Maine.

Legacy

In Cleveland, where Browne started his comedy career, an elementary school is named after him, known as Artemus Ward Elementary on W. 140th Street.  In the American Garden of the Cleveland Cultural Gardens in Rockefeller Park, a monument of him was erected, next to Mark Twain.

Stories
 A Visit to Brigham Young
 Women's Rights
 One of Mr Ward's Business Letters
 On "Forts"
 Fourth of July Oration
 High-Handed Outrage at Utica
 Artemus Ward and the Prince of Wales
 Interview with Lincoln
 Letters to his Wife

Books
 Artemus Ward His Book (1862) (full text online)
 Artemus Ward His Travels (1865) (full text online)
 Artemus Ward Among the Mormons (1865) (full text online)
 Artemus Ward in London (1867) (full text online)
 Artemus Ward's Panorama (1869) (full text online)
 Artemus Ward's Lecture (1869) (full text online)

References

External links

 
 
 
 
 
 The Vault at Pfaff's: Artemus Ward (a project of Lehigh University)
 Photos from the Maine Historical Society
 3 short radio episodes of Ward's writing from California Legacy Project.
 Seitz, Don Caros. Artemus Ward (Charles Farrar Browne): a biography and bibliography (1919) (full text online)

1834 births
1867 deaths
19th-century deaths from tuberculosis
People from Waterford, Maine
American humorists
Tuberculosis deaths in England
19th-century pseudonymous writers